CS Constantine, an Algerian professional association football club, has gained entry to Confederation of African Football (CAF) competitions on several occasions. They have represented Algeria in the Champions League on two occasions, and the Confederation Cup on two separate occasions.

History

CS Constantine whose team has regularly taken part in Confederation of African Football (CAF) competitions. Qualification for Algerian clubs is determined by a team's performance in its domestic league and cup competitions, CS Constantine have regularly qualified for the primary African competition, the African Cup, by winning the Ligue Professionnelle 1. CS Constantine have also achieved African qualification via the Algerian Cup and have played in the former African Cup Winners' Cup. The first continental participation was in 1998 in the CAF Champions League, and the first match was against AS Douanes and ended with a loss 2–1, As for the biggest defeat result was firstly in 2014 against ASN Nigelec, and the secondly in 2016 against Nasarawa United 4–1, and biggest loss in 2014 against ASEC Mimosas 6–0. so that CS Constantine was absent from the African competitions until 2014 Where did it participate in the CAF Confederation Cup, On 8 February 2014 witnessed a historic event when CS Constantine played two matches on the same day, the first in the Ligue Professionnelle 1 against MO Béjaïa and the second against ASN Nigelec in Niger and in both of them they were defeated by the same score 2–0. the Algerian Football Federation refused to postpone the matches of the championship for the Algerian clubs participating in African competitions because the FAF does not intend to end up with late matches that would disrupt the progress of a calendar allegedly tight because of the 2014 FIFA World Cup, it is for this reason that it strongly encouraged the Algerian clubs engaged in African competitions 2014 to withdraw. After winning the Ligue Professionnelle 1 title CS Constantine returned to the CAF Champions League after 20 years of absence, Qualifying for the group stage was a bit easy after winning against GAMTEL and Vipers putting him in group C with Club Africain, TP Mazembe and Ismaily. where CS Constantine ranked second to face in the quarter-finals the defending champions Espérance de Tunis to defeat 3–6 on aggregate.

CAF competitions

Non-CAF competitions

Statistics

By season
Information correct as of 13 April 2019.
Key

Pld = Played
W = Games won
D = Games drawn
L = Games lost
F = Goals for
A = Goals against
Grp = Group stage

PR = Preliminary round
R1 = First round
R2 = Second round
SR16 = Second Round of 16
R16 = Round of 16
QF = Quarter-final
SF = Semi-final

Key to colours and symbols:

By competition

In Africa
:

Non-CAF competitions
:

Statistics by country
Statistics correct as of game against Espérance de Tunis on April 13, 2019

CAF competitions

Non-CAF competitions

African competitions goals
Statistics correct as of game against Espérance de Tunis on April 13, 2019

Non-CAF competitions goals

List of All-time appearances
This List of All-time appearances for CS Constantine in African competitions contains football players who have played for CS Constantine in African football competitions and have managed to accrue 10 or more appearances. As well as participating in UAFA Club Championship for those who have exceeded the limit of 10 African matches only.

Gold Still playing competitive football in CS Constantine.

African and arab opponents by cities

Notes

References

Africa
CS Constantine